Lekhraj Bachani  (1929–2014)  was a leader of Bharatiya Janata Party from Gujarat. He was a member of Rajya Sabha. Earlier, he was a member of Gujarat Legislative Assembly from 1972 to 1995. Narendra Modi appreciated his immense contribution to the society. Governor of Gujarat Shri OP Kohli and Chief Minister Smt. Anandiben Patel also appreciated his contribution and also condoled on his demise.

References

1929 births
2014 deaths
Rajya Sabha members from Gujarat
People from Banaskantha district
Bharatiya Jana Sangh politicians
Gujarat MLAs 1972–1974
Gujarat MLAs 1990–1995
Bharatiya Janata Party politicians from Gujarat
Rajya Sabha members from the Bharatiya Janata Party